Some of the lands dominated by the ancient Persian dynasties yet carry Rostami (or Rostam) name as proclaimed the influencers of that region, village or district in the past however such regional influencers totally lost their authority after the fall of the Qajars and post World War modernization.

The list of places 

Rostami, Bushehr, in Bushehr Province
Rostami, Bu ol Kheyr, in Bushehr Province
Rostami, Delvar, in Bushehr Province
Rostami, in Hormozgan Provinece
Rostami, in Chaharmahal and Bakhtiari Province
Naqsh-e Rustam, in Fars Province
Chah-e Rostami, in Khorasan Province
Rostamabad, in Gilan Province
Rostamabad, in Kermanshah Province
Rostamabad, in Kerman Province
Rostamabad, in Ardabil Province
Rostamabad, in Tehran Province
Rostam, Sistan and Baluchestan
Rostam County, in Fars Province

See also
Rostami (disambiguation)
Rostam (disambiguation)
Rostamabad (disambiguation)
Baba Rostam (disambiguation)
Rostam Kandi (disambiguation)

References

Lists of populated places in Iran